Tevin Ihrig (born 10 March 1995) is a German footballer who plays as a defender for Wormatia Worms in the Regionalliga Südwest.

References

External links
 
 
 Tevin Ihrig at Wormatia's website

German footballers
Association football defenders
1. FSV Mainz 05 II players
Wormatia Worms players
3. Liga players
Regionalliga players
1995 births
Living people
People from Worms, Germany
Footballers from Rhineland-Palatinate